Kosmos 233 ( meaning Cosmos 233), known before launch as DS-P1-Yu No.15, was a Soviet satellite which was used as a radar calibration target for tests of anti-ballistic missiles. It was built by the Yuzhnoye Design Bureau, and launched in 1968 as part of the Dnepropetrovsk Sputnik programme.

Kosmos 233 was launched from Site 133/3 at the Plesetsk Cosmodrome, atop a Kosmos-2I 63SM carrier rocket. The launch occurred on 18 July 1968 at 19:59:50 UTC, and resulted in Kosmos 233's successful deployment into low Earth orbit. Upon reaching orbit, it was assigned its Kosmos designation, and received the International Designator 1968-061A.

It remained in orbit until it decayed and reentered the atmosphere on 7 February 1969. It was the fifteenth of seventy nine DS-P1-Yu satellites to be launched, and the fourteenth of seventy two to successfully reach orbit.

See also

1968 in spaceflight

References

Spacecraft launched in 1968
Kosmos satellites
Dnepropetrovsk Sputnik program